George Glass (August 19, 1910 – April 1, 1984) was an American film producer and publicist, best known for his work with Stanley Kramer. In Kramer's 1997 autobiography, describing how he formed his first production company in the late 1940s, he called Glass "one of the best publicity men in town", and remarked "I was fortunate to get Glass, with whom I had worked in the Lewin-Loew partnership before the war. He was a bright man and a very smooth operator." In a 1973 biography of Marlon Brando, Bob Thomas wrote:

George Glass was a veteran of movie publicity, but he was more than a publicist for Kramer. He, Kramer and Carl Foreman were partners in the independent film company, and Glass's brilliant campaigns for Champion and Home of the Brave had been a major part of the company's success. A short, stubby, ebullient man, he performed his craft on the basis of telling the truth.

Glass began his career in the entertainment industry as a radio news commentator and sports broadcaster, but left radio for films in 1936 to work in advertising and publicity capacities for Samuel Goldwyn, United Artists, and others. With Kramer's company, in addition to being the head publicist, Glass often acted as associate producer, sometimes uncredited (as for High Noon), and sometimes with screen credit (as for Cyrano de Bergerac and The Men). Other productions from this period include Death of a Salesman and The Wild One, for which Glass suggested the title.

In January 1952, Glass testified before the House Committee on Un-American Activities. In his testimony, he described attending gatherings at the homes of Ring Lardner, Jr. and other members of the entertainment industry in the mid-1940s, at which he was urged to become a member of the Communist Political Association.

In 1956, Glass and Walter Seltzer started a freelance publicity organization, described in the press as a collaboration of "two of the most experienced and able drum beaters" in Hollywood. After Brando formed his own production company, Pennebaker Productions, Glass and Seltzer joined him as executive producers, and together they turned out a number of films including Shake Hands with the Devil, The Naked Edge, Paris Blues and One-Eyed Jacks.

Glass was elected to the executive board of the Screen Producers Guild in 1960, along with Mervyn LeRoy. He continued to work with Kramer for many years as an associate producer, with additional credits including Guess Who's Coming to Dinner, The Secret of Santa Vittoria, Bless the Beasts and Children and R. P. M.

Glass is credited by several sources with originating the witticism, "An actor is a kind of guy who if you ain't talking about him [, he] ain't listening." (That line has also been attributed to Brando, who reportedly heard it from Glass and quoted it many times.)

References

Further reading
  Provides details about the subject's business relationship with Stanley Kramer, and his role in the events that led to the  blacklisting of  Carl Foreman.
  Interview with the subject in which he describes his career and his work with Kramer.

External links
 
 Profile of George Glass in Exhibitor, 1952

Film producers from California
People from Los Angeles
1910 births
1984 deaths
20th-century American businesspeople